Carlo Monni (23 October 1943 – 19 May 2013) was an Italian film, television and stage actor.

Born in Campi Bisenzio, Florence, Monni started his artistic activity in early seventies, as an actor in the Tuscan vernacular comic theater. After having played some minor roles in a number of low-budget films, the popularity came in the second half of 1970s, as the sidekick of his real life friend Roberto Benigni in a series of successful stage works, TV-programs, and then films (Berlinguer, I Love You, Seeking Asylum, Tu mi turbi, Nothing Left to Do But Cry). From then Monni started a productive career as a character actor, collecting over 300 appearances between cinema and theater.

References

External links

Further reading 
 Andrea Mancini, Carlo Monni. Tragedia di un uomo buffone, Titivillus, 2009, .
 Sandro Bartolini, Baciami francese. Le avventure giovanili di Carlo Monni, Pacini Fazzi, 2013, .

1943 births
2013 deaths
People from Campi Bisenzio
Italian male film actors
Italian male television actors
Italian male stage actors